Scopula dohertyi is a moth of the  family Geometridae. It is found in southern Sulawesi.

References

Moths described in 1897
dohertyi
Moths of Indonesia